Tazeh Kand-e Nasirabad (also Romanized as Tāzeh Kand-e Naşīrābād; also known as Tāzeh Kand) is a village in Dikleh Rural District, Hurand District, Ahar County, East Azerbaijan Province, Iran. At the 2006 census, its population was 49, in 13 families.

References 

Populated places in Ahar County